Pallevada is a village in Kaikaluru mandal of Krishna district, Andhra Pradesh, India.

Geography
It has an average elevation of 20 metres (68 ft).

Demographics
According to Indian census, 2001, the demographic details of Pallevada village is as follows:
 Total Population: 	2,955 in 726 Households
 Male Population: 	1,499 and Female Population: 	1,456
 Children Under 6-years of age: 358 (Boys - 	187 and Girls -	171)
 Total Literates: 	1,639

References

Villages in Krishna district